Athletics events at the 1986 South American Games were held at the Estadio Nacional in Santiago, Chile.  A total of 40 events were contested, 23 by men and 17 by women.

Medal summary

Medal winners were published in a book by written Argentinian journalist Ernesto Rodríguez III with support of the Argentine Olympic Committee (Spanish: Comité Olímpico Argentino) under the auspices of the Ministry of Education (Spanish: Ministerio de Educación de la Nación) in collaboration with the Office of Sports (Spanish: Secretaría de Deporte de la Nación).  Eduardo Biscayart supplied the list of winners and their results.

Men

Women

Medal table (unofficial)

References

1986
International athletics competitions hosted by Chile
South American Games
1986 South American Games